Drew may refer to:


Places
In the United States
 Drew, Georgia, an unincorporated community
 Drew, Mississippi, a city
 Drew, Missouri, an unincorporated community
 Drew, Oregon, an unincorporated community
 Drew County, Arkansas
 Drew Plantation, Maine

Elsewhere
 Drew, Ontario, Canada, a farming community

Schools in the United States 
 Drew University, Madison, New Jersey
 Drew High School (disambiguation)
 Drew School, a high school in San Francisco, California

Other uses 
 Drew (name), a given name and surname
 23452 Drew, an inner main-belt asteroid
 , a World War II United States Navy attack transport
 Drew Field, a World War II United States Army Air Forces base in Tampa, Florida
 The Drew Las Vegas, casino under construction in Las Vegas
 Drew Field Municipal Airport, former name for Tampa International Airport (1946-1950)
 "Drew", a song from the 2013 album Tales of Us by English electronic music duo Goldfrapp

See also 
 Dru (disambiguation)
 Draw (disambiguation)
 Justice Drew (disambiguation)